Kabaka may refer to:

Kabaka of Buganda, the title of the king of Buganda
Kabaka Puttur, a village in the state of Karnataka, India
Silas Kabaka, Sense8 character